Morris "Mo" Joseph Pleasure (born July 12, 1962) is an American composer, singer, producer and multi-instrumentalist.  Pleasure is a former member of the band Earth, Wind & Fire and he's the current musical director of Bette Midler. Pleasure has also collaborated with artists such as Ray Charles, Najee, George Duke, Marion Meadows, Natalie Cole, Roberta Flack, Michael Jackson, Janet Jackson, Peter Cetera and David Foster.

History 
Pleasure was born in Hartford, Connecticut.  His parents Robert and Evelyn Pleasure were originally from Louisiana, but moved to Hartford so Robert could attend Yale Divinity School from which he graduated in 1961.  The family then moved to Guilford, Connecticut when young Pleasure was 7 years old.  Pleasure began playing piano at age four and studied piano under Carol Wright from age seven to 17.

Frequent trips to Louisiana to visit family gave Pleasure a deep exposure to and appreciation for Gospel music as many of his relatives were active in church, and gospel music was the soundtrack of their lives.  And it was on these trips that he also experienced first hand the inequalities of a still segregated south.  A black family traveling through the south in those times could not stop at a hotel for the night, so the family would make these trips nonstop.

By the time Pleasure was a teenager, he had become proficient in trumpet, guitar, drums and violin as well.  He composed his first song at age 12. He accompanied his father (an accomplished tenor) at all the Guilford high school's graduations from 1975–80 and was active in his high school's music programs.  Pleasure holds a Bachelor of Arts degree in music from the University of Connecticut.

Some of his main influences for playing piano/keyboards include George Duke, Joe Sample, Ramsey Lewis, Herbie Hancock, Donald Blackman, and Chick Corea. Also, Verdine White, Chuck Rainey, James Jamerson, Jaco Pastorius, Bootsy Collins, and Chuck Rainey had a strong impact on Pleasure's love for the bass guitar and his approach to playing it.

Career
Pleasure started his career as a bassist in 1986 when he became a member of Ray Charles' orchestra. He went on to play on Najee's 1990 album Tokyo Blue, Everette Harp's 1992 self titled LP, Marion Meadows' 1992 album Keep It Right There and Stanley Clarke's 1993 LP Live at the Greek. During 1993 Pleasure joined up with the band Earth, Wind & Fire.

He later featured on Najee 's 1994 album Share My World and Marion Meadows' 1994 LP Forbidden Fruit. Pleasure then guested on jazz group Urban Knights's 1997 album Urban Knights II, Gerald Albright's 1997 LP Life To Love and produced on George Howard's 1998 album Midnight Mood.

After nine years with EWF, Pleasure went on to play on Janet Jackson's All For You tour and her 2002 feature film Janet: Live in Hawaii. 
He then guested on Boney James's 2004 album Pure and the 2004 Jimi Hendrix tribute album Power of Soul: A Tribute to Jimi Hendrix.

Pleasure has also played with artists such as George Duke, Mary J. Blige, Chaka Khan, Roberta Flack, Natalie Cole, Frankie Beverly & Maze, Peter Cetera and David Foster.  Pleasure went on to perform on Michael Jackson's 2009 feature film This Is It. He then worked with Christina Aguilera and later became the musical director of Bette Midler.

Personal life
He has devoted time to philanthropic efforts including fundraising for the Guilford ABC Program and Guilford High School music programs and co-founded "We R 1 Voice" with his ex-wife Lori in 2013. He currently lives in Aberystwyth, Wales, with his fellow musician/singer partner & wife Kedma Macias and their beautiful little girl.

Discography
Elements of Pleasure (2004) Watersign Records

References

External links
Official website
 

1962 births
Living people
Musicians from Hartford, Connecticut
American jazz composers
American male jazz composers
American jazz pianists
American male pianists
American multi-instrumentalists
American music arrangers
American pop pianists
American trumpeters
American male trumpeters
Music directors
Guitarists from Connecticut
University of Connecticut alumni
20th-century American bass guitarists
21st-century American bass guitarists
21st-century American keyboardists
20th-century American pianists
20th-century trumpeters
21st-century trumpeters
American male bass guitarists
Jazz musicians from Connecticut
21st-century American pianists
20th-century American male musicians
21st-century American male musicians
Earth, Wind & Fire members
20th-century American keyboardists
People from Aberystwyth